Rangasthalam is a 2018 Indian Telugu-language period action-drama film written and directed by Sukumar. Produced by Y. Naveen, Y. Ravi Shankar and C. V. Mohan for the company Mythri Movie Makers, the film stars Ram Charan and Samantha Akkineni with Aadhi Pinisetty, Jagapathi Babu, Prakash Raj, Naresh, and Anasuya Bharadwaj in key supporting roles.

Made on a budget of  million, and was released globally on 30 March 2018. Rangasthalam received positive reviews from the critics who were particularly appreciative of Sukumar's writing and the performances of the ensemble cast; they were critical of the film's slow pace and runtime nearing three hours.

At the 66th National Film Awards, the film won National Film Award for Best Audiography. It won ten awards at Zee Cine Awards Telugu. The film won many awards at 66th Filmfare Awards South and 8th South Indian International Movie Awards.

Accolades

See also 
 List of Tollywood films of 2018
 Rangasthalam (soundtrack)

Notes

References

External links 
 

Rangasthalam